Junaid Khan may refer to:

Junaid Khan (de facto ruler of Khiva), political leader in the Khanate of Khiva and the Basmachi movement 
Junaid Khan (cricketer), Pakistani cricketer
Junaid Khan (actor) (born 1981), Pakistani singer and actor
Junaid Jamshed Khan, Pakistani singer and preacher